John Rowell may refer to:
 John W. Rowell, Vermont attorney, businessman and judge
 John Samuel Rowell, American agricultural inventor and pioneer manufacturer